Gokyo Peak is a -high peak in the Khumbu region of the Nepal Himalayas. It is located on the west side of the Ngozumpa glacier, which is the largest glacier in Nepal and reputed to be the largest in the whole Himalayas. Gokyo (4,750 m, 15,583  
ft above sea level), at the base of Gokyo Ri, is a small hamlet of a few stone houses and one of the highest settlements in the world. From the summit of Gokyo Ri it is possible to see four 8,000-metre peaks: Mount Everest, Lhotse, Makalu and Cho Oyu. The Gokyo Lakes are in the area.

The Gokyo trek is a fairly popular trekking route. The route itself ends at Gokyo Ri, and trekkers typically turn around at this point and retrace their steps back to the trailhead. There is an alternative mountaineering route that begins near the southern tip of Ngozumpa Glacier and just south of Taujun Lake. This alternative route leads east over the Cho La, a pass at 5,420 m (17,782 ft), where it meets with the main Everest Base Camp trek.

It is usually visited during the circuit trek of Everest Base Camp with 3 Passes trek. It is slightly off route while visiting Everest base camps (Nepal side) but thousands of backpackers still visit it for the Gokyo Lakes beauty.

There is another higher summit just north of where the main Gokyo trek route ends.

Panorama

References

Mountains of Koshi Province
Five-thousanders of the Himalayas